Violet Avenue School is a historic school building located at Poughkeepsie, Dutchess County, New York.  It was built in 1939–1940, and is a two-story, five part, Colonial Revival style school building with load-bearing bluestone walls.  It consists of a central tetrastyle portico entry block flanked by four wings.  The central section features a central two-story classical portico with four columns with Corinthian order capitals and a prominent domed cupola. The school was built under the auspices of the Public Works Administration and President Franklin Delano Roosevelt was influential in the design.

It was added to the National Register of Historic Places in 2013.

References 

Public Works Administration in New York (state)
School buildings on the National Register of Historic Places in New York (state)
Colonial Revival architecture in New York (state)
School buildings completed in 1940
Buildings and structures in Poughkeepsie, New York
National Register of Historic Places in Poughkeepsie, New York